Banderdewa is a town in Lakhimpur District, Assam, India.

It is known for its vast electronic goods market and Hotels. It is a growing border settlement situated near the Dikrong River. It is well connected by road and railway. The nearest railway station is Harmutty railway station , and the nearest airport is Lilabari (IXI). 

Its name is derived from a temple of Panchmukhi Balaji. It acts as a gateway to Arunachal Pradesh, and hence is also called as check gate. To enter into Arunachal Pradesh one needs an ILP (Inner Line Permit).

Location
National Highway 52A starts at Banderdewa.

References

Cities and towns in Lakhimpur district